David William Drake  (November 23, 1834 – October 25, 1909) was a farmer, musician and the founder of the Stonewall Brigade Band. He began the band with Edwin Cushing, and recruited A. J. Turner as the band's first director. Drake moved to Staunton, Virginia in 1854.  He married Kate Murat Slaughter, of Rappahannock County, on April 15, 1868.  The band became part of the 5th Virginia Infantry Regiment.  He played a bugle, and was in the West Augusta Guard (Company L) before the band, and later in the 1st Virginia Cavalry. Jeb Stuart commended his volunteering to perform hazardous scouting duties across the Rappahannock River.

References

External links 

1834 births
1909 deaths
People from Staunton, Virginia
Brass musicians
Confederate States Army personnel
People from Frederick County, Virginia
19th-century American male musicians